Leinster was an electoral district of the Legislative Assembly of the Parliament of the Province of Canada, in Canada East, west of Montreal.  It was created in 1841, and was based on the previous electoral districts of l'Assomption and La Chesnaye (or Lachenaie) in the Legislative Assembly of Lower Canada. It was represented by one member in the Legislative Assembly. 

The electoral district was abolished in 1853, as part of the expansion and redistribution of electoral districts in that year.

Boundaries 

The Union Act, 1840 merged the two provinces of Upper Canada and Lower Canada into the Province of Canada, with a single Parliament.  The separate parliaments of Lower Canada and Upper Canada were abolished.Union Act, 1840, 3 & 4 Vict., c. 35, s. 2. 

The Union Act provided that while many of the pre-existing electoral boundaries of Lower Canada and Upper Canada would continue to be used in the new Parliament, some electoral districts would be defined directly by the Union Act itself.  Leinster was one of those new electoral districts. The Union Act merged the previous electoral districts of the County of Lachenaie and the County of L’Assomption, to create a new district, called Leinster.

The former districts of Lachenaie and l'Assomption had been defined by the 1829 boundaries as follows: 

With the merger of those counties, the new district stretched from south-west of Montreal (now Les Moulins Regional County Municipality), north across the Saint Lawrence River to the north-west of Montreal (now the L'Assomption Regional County Municipality).

Members of the Legislative Assembly 

Leinster was represented by one member in the Legislative Assembly. The following were the members of the Legislative Assembly from Leinster.

Notes

Abolition 
The Leinster electoral district was abolished in 1853, in the redistribution of electoral districts.

References 

Electoral districts of Canada East